Hansjörg Lips (born 10 April 1963) is a former Swiss curler.

He played  skip on the Swiss rink that won a silver medal at the 1988 Winter Olympics when curling was a demonstration sport. He is also a silver medallist at the 1994 European Curling Championships.

Teams

References

External links

 Soudog's Curling History Site: Curling at the Olympics - 1988

Living people
1963 births
Swiss male curlers
Curlers at the 1988 Winter Olympics
Olympic curlers of Switzerland
Place of birth missing (living people)
20th-century Swiss people